Dyullyukyu (Düllükü) is a rural locality (a selo) and the administrative center of Dyullyukinsky Rural Okrug of Verkhnevilyuysky District in the Sakha Republic, Russia, located  from Verkhnevilyuysk, the administrative center of the district. Its population as of the 2010 Census was 1,251, of whom 604 were male and 647 female, up from 1,173 as recorded during the 2002 Census.

References

Notes

Sources
Official website of the Sakha Republic. Registry of the Administrative-Territorial Divisions of the Sakha Republic. Verkhnevilyuysky District. 

Rural localities in Verkhnevilyuysky District